Ryburn may refer to:

Geography
River Ryburn, in West Yorkshire, England
Ryburn Reservoir, in West Yorkshire, England
Ryburn Valley High School, in West Yorkshire, England
Listed buildings in Ryburn
Halifax station (Nova Scotia), in Halifax, Nova Scotia, Canada
Halifax station (MBTA), in Halifax, Massachusetts, United States

People
Jocelyn Ryburn, President of the New Zealand Plunket Society
Hubert Ryburn, New Zealand Presbyterian minister and university college master
Bruce Ryburn Payne, American educator